Eilema fasciatella is a moth of the  subfamily Arctiinae. It was described by Strand in 1922. It is found in Madagascar.

References

fasciatella
Moths described in 1922